P.S. Burn This Letter Please is a 2020 documentary film about gay life in New York City among 1950s drag queens. The title is taken verbatim from a letter recounting the autumn 1958 theft of 33 luxurious wigs from the Metropolitan Opera House. The film is based on a trove of correspondence found in a storage unit in 2014, and includes archival footage of cross-dressing balls.

See also
Ed Limato
LGBT history in New York
New York City Drag March, shown in 2017 footage at the film's conclusion

References

External links
 
 

2020 documentary films
2020 films
2020 LGBT-related films
American documentary films
Documentary films about LGBT culture
Documentary films about New York City
Drag (clothing)-related films
2020s American films